Gautam Buddha Mahila College, also known as G.B.M. College, established in 1953, is one of the oldest general degree women's colleges in Gaya, Bihar. It  is affiliated to Magadh University, and offers undergraduate courses in science and arts. This is the oldest girl's only constituent of Magadh University.

Departments

Science

Chemistry
Physics
Mathematics
Biology

Arts & Management

 English
Hindi
Urdu
Economics
Political Science
Philosophy
Psychology
History
Business Management

Accreditation
Gautam Buddha Mahila College was accredited by the National Assessment and Accreditation Council (NAAC).

References

External links

Colleges affiliated to Magadh University
Universities and colleges in Bihar
Educational institutions established in 1953
1953 establishments in Bihar